Brachyglottis is a genus of flowering plants in the family Asteraceae. The genus was erected on November 29, 1775, by Johann Reinhold Forster and Georg Forster. The name was derived from the Greek brachus ("short") 
and glottis ("the vocal apparatus of the larynx") a reference to the size of the ray florets.

The genus is almost entirely native to New Zealand, except for B. brunonis, which occurs in Tasmania.

In cultivation in the UK, the cultivar 'Sunshine' has received the Royal Horticultural Society's Award of Garden Merit.

Diversity

There are about 39 accepted species names. Most species were transferred to the genus from Senecio in 1977 and 1978.

Species include:

Brachyglottis adamsii 
 Brachyglottis arborescens – Three Kings rangiora
Brachyglottis bellidioides  
Brachyglottis bidwillii 
Brachyglottis bifistulosa  
Brachyglottis brunonis
Brachyglottis buchananii 
Brachyglottis caledoniae 
Brachyglottis cassinioides
Brachyglottis christensenii 
Brachyglottis cockaynei
 Brachyglottis compacta (Kirk) B.Nord. – Wairarapa groundsel, piecrust plant
 Senecio compactus Kirk
 Brachyglottis elaeagnifolia (Hook. f.) B.Nord.
Senecio elaeagnifolius Hook. f.
Brachyglottis forsteri
 Brachyglottis greyi (Hook. f.) B.Nord.
 Senecio greyi Hook. f.
Brachyglottis haastii
Brachyglottis hectori
 Brachyglottis huntii (F.Muell.) B.Nord.
 Senecio huntii F.Muell.
 Brachyglottis lagopus (Raoul) B.Nord.
Senecio lagopus
Brachyglottis lapidosa
 Brachyglottis laxifolia (Buchanan) B.Nord.
Senecio laxifolius Buchanan
Brachyglottis matthewsii
 Brachyglottis monroi (Hook. f.) B.Nord. – Monro's ragwort
Senecio monroi Hook. f.
Brachyglottis myrianthos
Brachyglottis orbiculatus
 Brachyglottis pentacopa
 Brachyglottis perdicioides (Hook. f.) B.Nord.
Senecio perdicioides Hook. f.
Brachyglottis remotifolia
 Brachyglottis repanda J.R.Forst. & G.Forst. – rangiora, pukapuka, hedge ragwort
Brachyglottis revoluta
Brachyglottis rotundifolia – muttonbird scrub
 Brachyglottis saxifragoides (Hook. f.) B.Nord.
Senecio saxifragoides Hook. f.
Brachyglottis sciadophila 
Brachyglottis southlandica 
Brachyglottis spedenii  
 Brachyglottis stewartiae (J.B.Armstr.) B.Nord.
Senecio muelleri Kirk
Senecio stewartiae J.B.Armstr.
Brachyglottis traversii (F.Muell.) B.Nord.
Brachyglottis turneri

References

 
Asteraceae genera
Taxonomy articles created by Polbot
Flora of New Zealand